List of Pentecostal Pentecostal denominations.  Many of this denominations are members of the Pentecostal World Fellowship.  In North America, there is also an interdenominational organization called The Pentecostal/Charismatic Churches of North America (PCCNA). There is also a separate Nontrinitarian group of Pentecostal Churches commonly called Oneness Pentecostal Churches, but because of their differing views on the Trinity, they are generally categorized separately from Trinitarian Pentecostal and Full Gospel churches.  Many of the membership numbers below are reported by the denominations themselves, and as such they should be considered approximate.  Also, the list itself should not be considered comprehensive because there are many small, denominations which are below 100,000 in membership, and individual churches which chose not to affiliate with other denominations.

List of Trinitarian Pentecostal denominations 
Assemblies of God – 53.7 million
Apostolic Church – 15 million 
Foursquare Church - 8.8 million
Church of God (Cleveland, Tennessee) - 7 million
Church of God in Christ - 6.5 million
Church of Pentecost – 3.9 million
Christian Congregation of Brazil – 2.8 million
The Pentecostal Mission – 2.5 million
International Pentecostal Holiness Church – 2 million
Universal Church of the Kingdom of God – 2 million
Church of God of Prophecy – 1.5 million
Apostolic Faith Mission of South Africa – 1.4 million
Association of Pentecostal Churches of Rwanda – 1 million
Jesus Is Lord Church Worldwide – 1 million
Indian Pentecostal Church of God – 0.9 million
God is Love Pentecostal Church – 0.8 million
Pentecostal Church of God – .6 million
The Fellowship Network – .4 million
Manna Full Gospel Churches – .3 million
Open Bible Churches - .15 million
Full Gospel Church of God in South Africa - unknown
Elim Pentecostal Church
Swiss Pentecostal Mission 10'000 Members in 2013 
BewegungPlus about 5'000 Members
Freie Charismatische Gemeinden

List of Oneness Pentecostal Churches 
United Pentecostal Church International - 5.5m
Pentecostal Assemblies of the World - 1.5m

References 

Pentecostal
Pentecostalism-related lists